Gymnelia lyrcea is a moth of the subfamily Arctiinae. It was described by Herbert Druce in 1883. It is found in Ecuador.

References

 

Gymnelia
Moths described in 1883